At least three ships of the Hellenic Navy have borne the name Kriti after the Greek island of Crete:

  a  ordered by Greece but taken over by the Royal Navy before completion and renamed HMS Medea. Launched in 1915 and scrapped in 1921.
  a  launched in 1941 as HMS Hursley she was transferred to Greece in 1943 and renamed. She was returned to the Royal Navy in 1959 and scrapped in 1960.
  a  launched in 1945 as USS Page County transferred to Greece in 1971 and renamed. 

Hellenic Navy ship names